Hum Aapke Ghar Mein Rehte Hain is an Indian drama television series, which premiered on 10 August 2015 and was broadcast on SAB TV. The series is produced by Shashi Sumeet Productions of Shashi Mittal and Sumeet H. Mittal. The story of the series is about love-hate relationship between two neighboring families.

Plot

The story is about a former dacoit, Bachani Devi, who has surrendered and has turned into a peaceful person but is still feared by the people. She captures the house of a professor Tripathi thus starting a feud with his family.

Bachani Devi has a granddaughter, Shakti, who is tomboyish and a prankster and Professor Tripathi has a son, Raghav, who is a bookworm. Shakti's pranks often target Raghav. Shakti and Raghav's story takes a turn when Shakti's friend, Pinki, starts liking Raghav.

Cast

Main Casts 

Vibha Chibber as Bachani Devi Gupta, a former dacoit
Ahsaan Qureshi as Professor Jai Prakash Tripathi
Aditya Pandey as Raghav, Professor Tripathi's son Shakti's husband
Shivani Tomar as Shakti Gupta, Bachani Devi's granddaughter Raghav's wife
Zalak Desai (formerly Rose Sardana)  as Pinki, Shakti's friend

Recurring Characters

Surbhi Tiwari as Sarla Tripathi, Professor Tripathi's wife
Mahima Makwana as Disha
Hetal Puniwala as Sarla's brother
Sushil Parashar as Veer Pratap Gupta
Manini Mishra as Debolina, Veer Pratap's dream wife
Satish Sharma as Karamveer Gupta
Zahid Ali as Bhanvar Singh
Vikrant Soni as Manan, Raghav's younger brother
Ashok Lokhande as Sarla's uncle
Vrajesh Hirjee as Chandu Saxena, Pinki's uncle
Krishang Bhanushali as Shapath, Bachani Devi's grandson

References

2015 Indian television series debuts
Hindi-language television shows
Indian comedy television series
Television shows set in Mumbai
Sony SAB original programming
Shashi Sumeet Productions series